Anatole Auguste Boieldieu (1824 – 29 May 1886 in Chevilly-Larue) was a French entomologist who specialised in Coleoptera.
He was a member of the Société entomologique de France. His collection is conserved by the Association des Etudiants Paris
Boieldieu wrote many short and some longer scientific papers in which he described new taxa. Two important papers are
Quelques Coléoptères nouveaux des Iles d'Eubée et Baléares. Annales de la Société Entomologique de France (4) 5:5-12.(1865) ...
1859. Descriptions des espèces. nouvelles des Coléoptères. Annales de la Société Entomologique de France 7: 475–582. (1859).

References
Bourgeois, J. 1886 [Boieldieu, A. A.] Annales de la Société Entomologique de France. (6), Bull. LXXXIX
Constantin, R. 1992 Memorial des Coléopteristes Français. Bull. liaison Assoc. Col. reg. parisienne, Paris (Suppl. 14): 1-92.

1824 births
1886 deaths
French entomologists